Owen Smith (born 1970) is a British politician.

Owen Smith may refer to:

 Owen Smith (physician), Irish haematologist and academic
 Owen Smith (racing driver) (born 2000), American racing driver
 Owen Smith (sprinter), Welsh sprinter
 Owen H.M. Smith (born 1973), American television producer, writer, actor and comedian
 Owen Smith (table tennis), played table tennis at the 2010 Summer Youth Olympics
 Owen L. W. Smith, United States Ambassador to Liberia

See also 
 Tuppy Owen-Smith (1909–1990), South African cricketer
 C. E. Owen Smyth (1851–1925), South Australian public servant